TechStorm is a pay TV channel that carries Asian esports and tech-centric content. It debuted on StarHub and Singtel in 2019 and 2020 respectively The channel is owned and operated by TechTV Network Pte Ltd in Singapore. It was founded by Singaporean Debbie Lee. 

It partnered with Nanyang Technological University in adopting automatic content recognition (ACR) technology.

Programming 
Programming seen on TechStorm includes:

 Gamerz
 Innovation Nation
 Meet The Drapers Show
 Nintendo Quest
 Shark Tank Australia
 Storm Bytes –original production

References 

Esports television
Television channels and stations established in 2019